Lake Yarinacocha (possibly from Quechua yarina ivory palm, qucha lake) is a lake in Peru located in the Ucayali Region, Coronel Portillo Province, Yarinacocha District. Lake Yarinacocha lies west of the Ucayali River and northwest of Pucallpa.

See also
List of lakes in Peru

References

Lakes of Ucayali Region
Lakes of Peru